Saint-Pryvé Saint Hilaire FC is a French football club based in Saint-Pryvé-Saint-Mesmin that plays in Championnat National 2. It was created in 2000 by the merger of US Saint-Hilaire (created in 1966) and Saint-Pryvé CFC (1982).

History
In the 2019–20 Coupe de France round of 64, the club defeated Ligue 1 side Toulouse 1–0 in one of biggest upsets in the competition's history.

Their forward, Carnejy Antoine, was joint top scorer of the tournament, alongside Pablo Sarabia.

Current squad

References

External links
 

Football clubs in France
Sport in Loiret
Association football clubs established in 2000
2000 establishments in France
Football clubs in Centre-Val de Loire